Lowell Bennion may refer to

 Lowell L. Bennion (1908–1996) – American Latter-day Saint educator, writer, and humanitarian
 Lowell C. "Ben" Bennion (1935–), his son, a geographer, historian, and contributor to Mormonism: A Historical Encyclopedia